Docks of Hamburg or The Carmen of St. Pauli is a 1928 German silent drama film directed by Erich Waschneck and starring Jenny Jugo, Willy Fritsch, and Fritz Rasp. It was made by UFA at their Babelsberg Studio with location shooting in Hamburg. Art direction was by Alfred Junge. The film was released in the United States in 1930.

Premise
A merchant sailor becomes involved with a woman who works in a St. Pauli beer hall, leading him into a life of crime.

Cast

References

Bibliography

External links

1928 films
Films of the Weimar Republic
1928 drama films
German silent feature films
German drama films
Films directed by Erich Waschneck
Films set in Hamburg
Films shot in Hamburg
Films shot in Berlin
UFA GmbH films
German black-and-white films
Films shot at Babelsberg Studios
Silent drama films
1920s German films